Alon Abisola Arisicate Ajoke Olajuwon, better known as Abi Olajuwon (born July 6, 1988) is a Nigerian-American basketball coach and former player. Currently, she is an assistant coach for Connecticut Sun in the WNBA.

Olajuwon is the daughter of former NBA center Hakeem Olajuwon. Her name, Abisola Olajuwon, means "born into wealth and loved by all".

Playing career

High school and college
Born in Houston, Texas, Olajuwon played varsity basketball for her Californian high school, Marlborough School, and helped her team win three consecutive Southern Section titles.  Olajuwon was a 2006 McDonald's All-American, and was one of the most prized recruits of the 2006 graduating high school class. She played college basketball at the University of Oklahoma, and ESPN basketball analyst Nancy Lieberman stated before the 2006–07 season that the addition of Olajuwon would help propel the Sooners into contention for the NCAA championship.

In 2010, she earned a Bachelor of Arts degree in broadcast journalism and electronic media at the University of Oklahoma.

Oklahoma statistics
Source

Professional
Olajuwon was drafted 28th overall (third round) by the Chicago Sky in the 2010 WNBA draft. However, she was waived during the season. After being waived, Olajuwon signed with Hungarian SEAT-Lami-Véd Győr, and later played for CSM Satu Mare (Romania).

In 2011, Olajuwon returned to the WNBA and was signed by the Tulsa Shock and played there during the 2011 season.

During the offseason, she played for Hapoel Rishon LeZion (Israel), ŽKK Novi Zagreb (Croatia), BC Castors Braine (Belgium). Olajuwon was waived by Tulsa Shock before the 2012 season. After being waived she played for Esportivo Ourinhos (Brazil), and Heilongjiang Chenneng (China).

Olajuwon finished her career playing for Spanish club Caja Rural Zamarat.

Coaching career
In May 2014, Olajuwon became an assistant coach for the women's basketball team at California State University, Fullerton.

On May 20, 2016, Olajuwon was hired as an assistant coach for the women's Eastern Michigan Eagles.

References

External links
 
 

1988 births
Living people
African-American basketball players
American expatriate basketball people in China
American sportspeople of Nigerian descent
American people of Yoruba descent
American women's basketball coaches
American women's basketball players
Basketball coaches from Texas
Basketball players from Texas
Centers (basketball)
Chicago Sky draft picks
Chicago Sky players
Connecticut Sun coaches
Heilongjiang Dragons players
McDonald's High School All-Americans
Oklahoma Sooners women's basketball players
Tulsa Shock players
Yoruba sportswomen
ŽKK Novi Zagreb players
21st-century African-American sportspeople
21st-century African-American women
20th-century African-American people
20th-century African-American women